The historic Round Hill hotel and villa resort near Montego Bay in Hopewell, Hanover, Jamaica opened in 1952. It is located on a  peninsula and has entertained many celebrities and politicians including  John F. Kennedy, Ralph Lauren, Paul Newman and Bob Hope. Ian Fleming was a frequent guest at Round Hill during his time in Jamaica.

History
Round Hill was conceived by John Pringle as a private haven for celebrities. Twenty-nine acres of the estate's land were set aside for the resort. Investors supplied money to build a hotel, and built their own cottages on the site.  Shareholders have included Noël Coward, Adele Astaire, Bill Paley, Oscar Hammerstein, and Clive Brook.

Round Hill has been host to the Sugar Cane Carnival, a fundraising event for a Jamaican charity, for over 50 years.

In popular culture

Scenes from the American movie How Stella Got Her Groove Back were filmed in Cottage 11.

A collection of Jonathan Routh paintings is on display throughout the property. Jonathan stayed at Round Hill frequently and painted scenes depicting Round Hill.

Scenes from In Like Flint starring James Coburn were filmed at the hotel in the summer of 1966. 

Round Hill was featured on the finale of The Amazing Race 7 with the final three teams finishing the first half of the episode at Villa 16.

See also
 List of hotels in Jamaica

References

External links
Round Hill Hotels and Villas Resort

Resorts in Jamaica
Buildings and structures in Hanover Parish
Tourist attractions in Hanover Parish
Hotel buildings completed in 1952
Hotels in Jamaica